Apple Authorized Service Providers are independent companies which are certified by Apple Inc., which carry out in-warranty or out-of-warranty repairs of Apple products as part of the company's AppleCare program. Apple provides them with tools, and training, and service manuals. All technicians working on these repairs must be Apple Certified Technicians.

History
An Apple Reseller befriended Dr. Gil Amelio, then CEO of Apple, and recommended that they form a reseller channel designation. Dr. Amelio assigned Paddy Wong and Loretta Flores of Apple the task of designing the program, with input from a few resellers. The original scope was fairly small, but only included resellers who mainly sold Apple products and not competitors.

Apple rolled out the Apple Specialist Program in December 1996. It continued under that name through 2016. Apple has since disbanded the Specialist Program and moved onto Premier Partners. This program involves meeting higher quality standards. If you are unable to meet these standards you are dropped to a Value-added resellers.

Before the introduction of Apple retail stores, the Specialist resellers, typically locally owned small businesses, were primary contributors to retail sales channel and user support for the computer manufacturer among other Apple-authorized resellers and Value-added resellers.

Apple Specialists qualify as Apple-authorized resellers and service providers and, additionally, maintain a higher minimum of Apple product sales while limiting sales of competing products. They are owned and managed independently, choosing their own business focus from among retail, business-to-business, professional and vertical markets.

In 2004, members of Apple's Reseller Advisory Board formed the Apple Specialist Marketing Coop (ASMC). Since that time ASMC has grown to include more than 160 members.

See also 

 Apple certification programs

External links
Apple Specialist section from Apple's website
Apple Specialist website, developed independently by ASMC

 
Apple Inc. services
Computer-related introductions in 1996
2016 disestablishments